Stadium anthems or sports anthems or arena anthems are terms to refer songs that are played over the public address systems at stadiums and arenas during breaks in the action to rally the fans.  Unlike college fight songs, most stadium anthems were not written primarily for use at sports events, though compilations such as ESPN Presents Stadium Anthems and the "Jock" series occasionally feature remixed versions of these songs designed to segue together or to accentuate the rhythm or other elements of the songs. Some football events have their own anthems, which are not played during breaks, but rather as entrance music, the most notable being the FIFA Anthem and the UEFA Champions League Anthem.

Stadium anthems are characterized by a catchy uptempo rhythm and a repeated vocal call-response catchphrase, often a statement of pride (such as "We Will Rock You", "We Are the Champions" and "Another One Bites the Dust" by Queen). Most stadium anthems are drawn from popular rock and roll, dance or rap hits.  At college football games, the schools' marching bands often add stadium anthems to their repertoires.  In baseball, many stadium anthems are used as entrance music for various ballplayers.  For example, AC/DC's "Hells Bells" was the entrance music for Trevor Hoffman and Metallica's "Enter Sandman" filled the same role for Mariano Rivera.

Some stadium anthems are popular in a particular region, or with a specific team because of a reference in the song's lyrics. "You'll Never Walk Alone" is the club anthem of Liverpool F.C. "Just idag är jag stark" by Kenta is the club anthem of Hammarby Fotboll. The Dallas Cowboys made heavy use of "Should've Been a Cowboy" by Toby Keith in the 1990s, while sports teams in Alabama often use "Sweet Home Alabama" by Lynyrd Skynyrd.  In a rare example of a team actually being mentioned in a song's lyrics, the University of Alabama marching band often plays "Deacon Blues" by Steely Dan due to the school being referred to as one of "the winners in the world", even though the reference was intended to be sarcastic.

Popular sports anthems

Association football 
FIFA Anthem
AFC Anthem
UEFA Champions League Anthem
UEFA Europa League Anthem
Major League Soccer Anthem
J.League Anthem - "J'S THEME
Japan Football Association Anthem - "Japanese Soccer Anthem"

Versatile 
"Rock and Roll Part 2" by Gary Glitter
"We Will Rock You" by Queen
"We Are the Champions" by Queen
"Another One Bites The Dust" by Queen
"Thunderstruck" by AC/DC
"Gonna Fly Now" by Bill Conti
"Get Ready for This" by 2 Unlimited
"Remember the Name" by Fort Minor
"Na Na Hey Hey Kiss Him Goodbye" by Steam
"Song 2" by Blur
"Crazy Train" by Ozzy Osbourne
"Blitzkrieg Bop" by The Ramones
"Mr. Touchdown, U.S.A." by Ruth Roberts
"Seven Nation Army" by The White Stripes
"Sirius" by The Alan Parsons Project
"Kernkraft 400" by Zombie Nation
"Eye of the Tiger" by Survivor
"Welcome to the Jungle" by Guns 'N' Roses
"Don't Stop Believin'" by Journey
"Heroes" by David Bowie
"Sweet Caroline" by Neil Diamond
"Swag Surfin" by Fast Life Yungstaz
"Don't Look Back in Anger" by Oasis
"Halftime (Stand Up and Get Crunk)" by Ying Yang Twins
"Maria (I Like It Loud)" by Scooter

See also

Entrance music
Fight song
Football chant
Theme music
Music at sporting events
Jock series

References

External links
 HockeyMusic.ca

Sports culture
Sports terminology
Sports anthems